Peppermill Village is an unincorporated community near Maryland Route 214 (Central Avenue) in Prince George's County, Maryland, United States. Per the 2020 census, the population was 5,264. FedExField, Metrorail's Blue Line, and Hampton Mall shopping center are all located nearby. Because it is not formally incorporated, it has no official boundaries, but the United States Census Bureau has defined a census-designated place (CDP) consisting of Peppermill Village and the adjacent community of Carmody Hills, for statistical purposes.

Geography
The CDP is bordered to the west and north by the city of Seat Pleasant, to the north and east by the Summerfield CDP, and to the south by the Walker Mill CDP. Peppermill Village is bounded to the east by Hill Road, west by Carmody Hills Drive, north by Seat Pleasant Drive and south by Maryland Route 214, or Central Avenue, which to the west becomes East Capitol Street in the District of Columbia and to the east connects with the Capital Beltway and the town of Largo.

Demographics

2020 census

Note: the US Census treats Hispanic/Latino as an ethnic category. This table excludes Latinos from the racial categories and assigns them to a separate category. Hispanics/Latinos can be of any race.

2010 Census
The population of the CDP was 4,895 at the 2010 census. For previous censuses, the CDP was named "Carmody Hills-Pepper Mill Village".

It has a majority African-American population.

Schools
The CDP is served by the Prince George's County Public Schools district.

Almost all of the CDP is zoned to Carmbody Hills elementary while a small section is zoned to Cora L. Rice Elementary. All residents are zoned to G. James Gholson Middle School.

References

Census-designated places in Prince George's County, Maryland
Census-designated places in Maryland